Patna Women's College, established in 1940, is a women's college in Patna, Bihar. It is affiliated to Patna University, and offers undergraduate and postgraduate courses in science, arts, commerce and vocational.

Accreditation
Patna Women's College was awarded A grade by the National Assessment and Accreditation Council (NAAC).

Notable alumni 
 Sweta Singh, Indian journalist
 Papiya Ghosh, Noted Historian
 Dipali, Indian Idol Fame
Archana Soreng, Indian Environmental Activist

References

External links
Patna Women's College

Colleges affiliated to Patna University
Women's universities and colleges in Bihar
Universities and colleges in Patna
Educational institutions established in 1940
1940 establishments in India